Leonard Frederick Treganowan (14 June 1931 – 21 February 1988) was an Australian weightlifter. He competed in the men's middle heavyweight event at the 1956 Summer Olympics.

References

External links

1931 births
1988 deaths
Australian male weightlifters
Olympic weightlifters of Australia
Weightlifters at the 1956 Summer Olympics
Place of birth missing
Commonwealth Games medallists in weightlifting
Commonwealth Games bronze medallists for Australia
Weightlifters at the 1958 British Empire and Commonwealth Games
20th-century Australian people
Medallists at the 1958 British Empire and Commonwealth Games